LBCT may refer to:

 Little Blue Crunchy Things
 Long Beach Container Terminal; see Port of Long Beach